I-pop can refer to:
Indian pop, pop music of India
Indo pop, pop music of Indonesia
I-pop (subgenre), the boy group/girl group/idol group scene of Indonesia
Israeli Pop, pop music of Israel; see

See also 
 IPOP, IP-Over-P2P,  is an open-source user-centric software virtual network
 IpOp Model, a strategic management approach for pre-project analysis suitable for innovation management and corporate entrepreneurship